The Central District of Mahmudabad County is a district (bakhsh) in Mahmudabad County, Mazandaran Province, Iran. At the 2006 census, its population was 59,397, in 15,737 families.  The District has one city: Mahmudabad. The District has three rural districts (dehestan): Ahlamerestaq-e Jonubi Rural District, Ahlamerestaq-e Shomali Rural District, and Harazpey-ye Gharbi Rural District.

References 

Mahmudabad County
Districts of Mazandaran Province